David Goldie (1842 – 8 June 1926) was the Mayor of Auckland City from 1898 to 1901 and a Member of Parliament in New Zealand. The artist C. F. Goldie was his son.

Biography

Early life
Born in Hobart, Tasmania, in 1842, Goldie emigrated to New Zealand in 1863.

He was a prominent timber merchant, and a strict Primitive Methodist. He was the father of artist C. F. Goldie.

Political career

On 27 November 1873, Goldie was elected to the Auckland Provincial Council for the Auckland West electorate. He remained a councillor until the abolition of provincial government at the end of 1876.

Goldie contested the Auckland West electorate in a by-election on 4 March 1879. The by-election was caused by the resignation of Patrick Dignan, who also stood in this contest. Dignan and Goldie received 261 and 776 votes, respectively, and with a majority of 515 votes, Goldie was declared elected. He served until the dissolution of parliament on 15 August of that year.

Goldie represented the Auckland West electorate again from 1887 to 1890. He then represented the Newton electorate from 1890 to 1891 as a Liberal MP, when he resigned.

In December 1898, Goldie was elected mayor of Auckland. He was returned without opposition to this role in 1899 and 1900. He retired as mayor prior to the municipal elections in April 1901 rather than toast the visiting Duke and Duchess of Cornwall and York with alcohol later that year. He was replaced as mayor for the jubilee year by the Father of Auckland, Sir John Logan Campbell.

Death
He died at his home in Auckland on 8 June 1926 and was buried at Purewa Cemetery.

Notes

References

|-

1842 births
1926 deaths
Politicians from Hobart
Australian emigrants to New Zealand
Members of the New Zealand House of Representatives
New Zealand temperance activists
Mayors of Auckland
New Zealand businesspeople
New Zealand Liberal Party MPs
New Zealand Methodists
New Zealand MPs for Auckland electorates
Burials at Purewa Cemetery
Members of the Auckland Provincial Council